Into Somethin' is a 1965 album by jazz organist Larry Young, his debut for Blue Note records. It features a quartet of Young, tenor saxophonist Sam Rivers, guitarist Grant Green and drummer Elvin Jones. Young had previously recorded with Green and Jones (under Green's name).

Track listing
All compositions by Larry Young except as indicated
 "Tyrone" - 9:40
 "Plaza De Toros" (Green) - 9:39
 "Paris Eyes" - 6:42
 "Backup" - 8:40
 "Ritha" - 6:45

On the 1998 "Connoisseur Series" CD reissue, a quartet version of "Ritha" is included in addition to the take featured on the vinyl issue.

Personnel
Larry Young - organ
Sam Rivers - tenor saxophone (#1-4)
Grant Green - guitar
Elvin Jones - drums

References 

Larry Young (musician) albums
1965 albums
Blue Note Records albums
Albums produced by Alfred Lion
Albums recorded at Van Gelder Studio